Kumulus is the name of a rocket of the "Hermann-Oberth-Gesellschaft e.V.". The first Kumulus rocket was launched on December 20, 1960, near Cuxhaven. A Kumulus rocket is on display at the Hermann Oberth Space Travel Museum in Feucht.

Technical data
 Diameter: 15 cm 
 Length: 3 m 
 Thrust: 5 kN 
 Maximum height: 20 km 
 Payload: 5 kg (for 20 km altitude) 
 Launch mass: 60 kg
 Mass without fuel and payload: 28 kg

Rockets and missiles